Garner–Hayfield–Ventura Community School District is a rural public school district headquartered in Garner, Iowa. In addition to the cities of Garner and Ventura, it also serves the unincorporated areas of Duncan, Hayfield, and Miller. The district is located in Hancock and Cerro Gordo counties.

History
It was established on July 1, 2015, with the merger of the Garner–Hayfield Community School District and the Ventura Community School District. The election to determine whether the districts would merge was held on September 9, 2014, with 602–22 in Garner–Hayfield and 351–51 counts in Ventura favoring the merger. Approval required each district to have over half of its constituents to vote in favor. The two districts previously had a whole grade-sharing arrangement, in which students from one district would attend another district's schools, beginning in 2012, and prior to that time the two districts shared specialized classes.

As a result of the merger, an interim board was to be established, with the number of board members depending on the population ratio of the territories of the previous districts, resulting in four members from Garner–Hayfield and two members from Ventura.

Schools
 Garner–Hayfield–Ventura High School (Garner)
 It was established from the former Garner–Hayfield High School in 2012 after grade-sharing began. 100 of its students that year came from the Ventura school district.
 Garner–Hayfield–Ventura Middle School (Ventura)
 Garner–Hayfield–Ventura Elementary School (Garner)
 GHV Education Center/Lakeside Alternative Program (Ventura)

Garner–Hayfield–Ventura High School

Athletics
The Cardinals participate in the Top of Iowa Conference in the following sports:
Football
 1991 Class 2A State Champions
Cross Country
Volleyball
Basketball
Bowling
Wrestling
Golf
Track and Field
Baseball
Softball

See also
List of school districts in Iowa
List of high schools in Iowa

References

Further reading

External links
 Garner–Hayfield–Ventura Community School District

School districts in Iowa
2015 establishments in Iowa
School districts established in 2015
Education in Cerro Gordo County, Iowa
Education in Hancock County, Iowa